Weybourne LNR is a   Local Nature Reserve on the southern outskirts of Weybourne in Surrey. It is owned and managed by Waverley Borough Council.

This site has a variety of habitats, including woodland, grassland, fen and scrub.

There is access from Weybourne Road.

References

Local Nature Reserves in Surrey